Richard Danso (born 16 September 2000) is a Ghanaian footballer who most recently played as a forward for Tirana  in Albanian Superliga.

Club career
Danso was set to move to Tunisian side Étoile du Sahel in January 2019 on a deal through 2022 after impressing in the Ghanaian Premier League.  However, the deal fell through after an international transfer certificate could not be obtained. Instead, Danso joined North Texas SC on a loan until the end of the season.

Honours 
 WAFA
 Ghana Premier League Runner-Up: 2017

Career statistics

References

External links
 
 Richard Danso at FC Dallas

2000 births
Living people
Ghanaian footballers
Association football forwards
Ghana Premier League players
Étoile Sportive du Sahel players
Ghana youth international footballers